Trumpler 27-1 is a red supergiant star that is a member of the massive, possible open cluster Trumpler-27, where a blue giant star, a yellow supergiant star , and two Wolf–Rayet stars are also located.

Observation history
Trumpler 27-1 was discovered and catalogued when the open cluster (not confirmed then) was first identified in the late 20th century. It has since remained largely unobserved, being featured in the Gaia Catalogue and other pieces of literature.

Physical properties
Trumpler 27-1 is among the largest stars known, with a radius of over 1,000 solar radii, one estimate giving  and another giving a size of over 1,300 solar radii. This star's spectral type is M0Ia, meaning it possesses a cool temperature of below 3,800 K. So far, Trumpler 27-1 is the only identified red supergiant in the open cluster Trumpler 27.

Location 
Trumpler 27–1, and the open cluster in which it is located, is in the constellation of Scorpius.

See also 

 Westerlund 1-26
 RSGC1

References

M-type supergiants
Scorpius (constellation)
Suspected variables
Durchmusterung objects